Kristen Melissa Ledlow (born January 18, 1988) is an American sports anchor. She currently works for NBA TV as the host of NBA Inside Stuff. She currently is a courtside reporter for the NBA on TNT. She has also served as a sports anchor for HLN and CNN.

Early life
Ledlow attended Christian Community School, then North Florida Christian School, playing basketball and volleyball, while running track and cross country. She attended Southeastern University in Lakeland, Florida, majoring in broadcasting and communications, while minoring in business, and graduated in 2010. She was an All-American volleyball player with the school, and after games, she served as lead announcer for the men's basketball games.

During her senior year, Ledlow was crowned Miss Capital City USA, and also finished third in the state pageant.

Broadcasting career
After graduating from college, Ledlow became an anchor at WTXL-TV, hosting the Good News Show, while writing for the Tallahassee Quarterback Club and working on radio for ESPN Tallahassee, later becoming a sideline reporter for Florida State Seminoles football games. Afterwards, she joined CBS Sports Radio as a cohost of The Opening Drive. On one occasion, she turned down an internship with ESPN to work in an athletic ministry. In 2013, Ledlow joined WZGC as a host, working alongside Jason Bailey and Randy Cross. She left the station on March 4, 2014.

In 2015, Ledlow was hired by NBA TV as a host for NBA Inside Stuff alongside former NBA player Grant Hill.

Ledlow participated in the 2014 NBA All-Star Weekend Celebrity Game for the East team, scoring twice in the first half.

Personal life
She has been married to Will Ramanakiwai since 2018.

References

External links
 
 

Living people
American television sports announcers
College football announcers
Florida State Seminoles football announcers
National Basketball Association broadcasters
Women sports announcers
ESPN people
1988 births
Southeastern University (Florida) alumni